Şorsulu or Shorsulu or Shorsuli or Shorsuly may refer to:
Şorsulu, Gobustan, Azerbaijan
Şorsulu, Salyan, Azerbaijan